Krankhaus (comes from "Krankenhaus" which is German for Hospital) is the debut studio album by Australian electro-industrial band Angelspit. It was self-released on 6 June 2006, and re-released on 30 January 2007 with a bonus remix disc and in the US by Dancing Ferret Discs, entitled Surgically Atoned, containing remixes by The Tenth Stage, Combichrist, Tankt, The Crystalline Effect and even Angelspit themselves. A music video for "Vena Cava" was released.

Track listing

Trivia
Fans who purchased Krankhaus from the official Angelspit store received a letter from ZooG, thanking them for supporting Angelspit's album release, along with a badge of the 'red baron' (the logo for the Krankhaus album).
 The "Elixir" (Pill Binge Remix) is listed on the official website's discography as a bonus web only track is offered as a free MP3 download (NOTE: The link, though still describing itself as before, is currently instead pointing at a sample of the first minute of Elixr, and the site administrator has not responded to questions about the change.). It is not available on the CD itself.
 Combichrist, responsible for the "100%" (110% Fucked Mix), made a second remix of "100%" entitled "100%" (99% Rawmix) that was not released on the Surgically Atoned remix disc. It was, however, released on two separate compilation albums ADVANCED ELECTRONICS 5 and Fxxk the Mainstream

References

External links
Krankhaus at Angelspit.net

2006 debut albums
Angelspit albums
2007 remix albums